George Lanyon Hacker (born 27 April 1928), was the sixth Suffragan Bishop of Penrith in the modern era.

Biography
Hacker was educated at Kelly College, Tavistock and Exeter College, Oxford, he was ordained after a period of study at Ripon College Cuddesdon in 1955. He began his career with a curacy at St Mary Redcliffe
 before spells as Chaplain at King's College London, Perpetual curate at the Church of the Good Shepherd, Bishopwearmouth and Rector of Tilehurst.

In 1979 he ascended to the Episcopate, a post he held for 15 years. In retirement he has continued to serve the church as an Assistant Bishop within his old diocese.

References

1928 births
People educated at Kelly College
Alumni of Exeter College, Oxford
Alumni of Ripon College Cuddesdon
Bishops of Penrith
20th-century Church of England bishops
Living people